John Couch is the name of:

John H. Couch (1811–1870), American sea captain and pioneer
John Couch (American football), former college football coach for Fordham University
John Couch (classical guitarist) (born 1976), New Zealand classical guitarist
John Couch Adams (1819–1892), English astronomer
John Couch (American executive), executive most closely associated with Apple Computer
John Nathaniel Couch (1896–1986), American mycologist

See also
John H. Couch (side-wheeler), steamboat